Treasure Inn is a 2011 Hong Kong wuxia comedy film directed by Wong Jing and Corey Yuen, starring Nicholas Tse, Nick Cheung, Charlene Choi, Liu Yang, Tong Dawei and Huang Yi.

Plot
Master Kung and Lo Pa are two police officers of White Horse City, who have high skills but are underused. An opportunity to prove themselves arises when a robbery takes place at the home of the city's richest man, Ho Pak Man, in which his whole family is killed and the family treasure, the "White Jade Goddess of Mercy," is stolen. Their chance for glory is cut short, however, when the "Police God" Tit Mo Ching is called in to investigate the case. He bars Kung and Lo Pa from further participation in the investigation because of their low status.

Coincidentally, Master Kung and Lo Pa arrest a pair of twin sisters, Water Dragon Girl and Fire Dragon Girl, who always pretend to catch wanted criminals to get monetary rewards. The twin sisters know that the "White Jade Goddess of Mercy" would be brought to the "Treasure Inn" for an auction. Wanting to hit big, Master Kung and Lo Pa go to the "Treasure Inn" with the twin sisters to investigate the truth. During that time, Master Kung and Water Dragon Girl become lovers.

Cast
Nicholas Tse as Master Kung (龔少爺), a low ranking officer in the yamen kitchen and a skilled martial artist. He has a relationship with Water Dragon Girl.
Nick Cheung as Lo Pa (老巴), a low ranking officer in the yamen kitchen and Master Kung's partner. He and Fire Dragon Girl become a couple.
Charlene Choi as Water Dragon Girl (水龍女), the younger of the "Reward Money Hunters" twin sisters. She loves Master Kung.
Huang Yi as Fire Dragon Girl (火龍女), the older of the "Reward Money Hunters" twin sisters. She is hot tempered. She and Lo Pa become a couple.
Liu Yang as Yuk Ling-lung (玉玲瓏), the owner of Treasure Inn. She loves Master Kung.
Tong Dawei as Man Man Chit (聞問切), a nerd who is actually a skilled martial artist and doctor. He loves Yuk Ling-lung.
Kenny Ho as Tit Mo Ching (鐵無情), the primary antagonist and arch enemy of Master Kung and Lo Pa
Boss as Seung Seung (上上), an imperial agent
Hot Zhao as Siu Siu (小小), an imperial agent
Zhao Yitong as District Lady (縣夫人), the mean and cocky wife of the mayor
Zhang Xiaodong as God Eye Chu Sam (神眼朱三), a skilled martial artist with superhuman abilities

Release
The film was released on 23 June 2011 in Hong Kong.

Reception

Critical reception 
Loong Wai Ting of The Malay Mail gave the film a mediocre review, described the film as "by far one of his [Director Wong Jing] better films and one can't help but to feel entertained by the movie" but "there is certainly no treasure". AsiaOne gave Treasure Inn a rating of 3.5 stars out of 5.

Box office 
The Treasure Inn has been a box office success, grossing RMB81.4 million at the box office ($12.6 million) as of 12 July 2011.

References

External links

Treasure Inn at Hong Kong Cinemagic
財神客棧 (Treasure Inn) at Yahoo Movies HK

2011 films
Films directed by Wong Jing
Hong Kong action comedy films
2011 action comedy films
Wuxia films
Kung fu films
2010s Cantonese-language films
2010s Hong Kong films